USS Clamagore (SS-343) was a  submarine, which operated as a museum ship at the Patriot's Point Naval & Maritime Museum outside Charleston, South Carolina from 1979 to 2022. Built in 1945 for the United States Navy, she was still in training when World War II ended. She was named for the clamagore. A National Historic Landmark, she was the last surviving example of a GUPPY III type submarine.
On 15 October 2022, the USS Clamagore, stripped of sail and superstructure was removed from Patriots Point and towed to Norfolk VA to begin final recycling.

Construction
Clamagore was built by Electric Boat Co. in Groton, Connecticut near the end of World War II. She was launched on 25 February 1945 and sponsored by Miss Mary Jane Jacobs, daughter of Vice Admiral Randall Jacobs and commissioned on 28 June 1945, with Commander S.C. Loomis, Jr., taking command.

Operational history
Clamagore was first assigned to Key West, Florida, and reported there on 5 September 1945. She operated off Key West with various fleet units and with the Fleet Sonar School, voyaging on occasion to Cuba and the Virgin Islands until 5 December 1947, when she entered Philadelphia Naval Shipyard for GUPPY II modernization and installation of snorkel.

Clamagore returned to Key West 6 August 1948 and assumed local and Caribbean operations for the next eight years, except for a tour of duty in the Mediterranean from 3 February to 16 April 1953.

Clamagore called at New London, Connecticut and Newport, Rhode Island early in 1957, returning to Key West 13 March. Between 23 September and 7 December she took part in NATO exercises in the North Atlantic, calling at Portsmouth, England, and Naval Station Argentia, Newfoundland. On 29 June 1959, she arrived at Charleston, her new home port, and after a period of coastwise operations, sailed 5 April 1960 to join the 6th Fleet in the Mediterranean for a tour of duty which continued until July, when the submarine returned to Charleston. For the remainder of 1960 Clamagore operated off the east coast.

In 1962, Clamagore became one of only nine boats to undergo the GUPPY III conversion. She had a  hull extension added forward of the control room, a plastic sail and the BQG-4 PUFFS passive ranging sonar, which included the three sharkfin sensors on her deck.

Clamagore finished her GUPPY III conversion in February 1963, and was transferred to Submarine Squadron 2 (SUBRON2) in Groton, Connecticut.

Post operational history
Clamagore was decommissioned on 12 June 1975 and stricken on 27 June 1975 after having served in the Navy for thirty years. She was donated as a museum ship on 6 August 1979.

Clamagore arrived at Patriot's Point Naval & Maritime Museum, Charleston, South Carolina in May 1981, where she was moored as a museum ship along with aircraft carrier  and destroyer .

Clamagore was listed on the National Register of Historic Places and designated a National Historic Landmark on 29 June 1989.

According to the South Carolina Department of Archives and History, Clamagore "is now the only surviving GUPPY type III submarine in the United States. She represents the continued adaptation and use of war-built diesel submarines by the Navy for the first two decades after the war." The GUPPY conversion submarines constituted the bulk of the nation's submarine force through the mid-1960s.

Due to severe degradation of the hull the Patriot Point museum has on several occasions looked for an alternate means to preserve the vessel. On 10 January 2017 the Palm Beach County Commissioners voted unanimously to approve funds for the vessel to be sunk as an artificial reef. On 16 April 2019 a group of retired submariners sued the State of South Carolina to save the Clamagore. In early 2020, the museum formed a plan to sink Clamagore at the Vermilion Reef site before the 2021 hurricane season. As of 2022 the museum has announced plans to scrap the submarine as the cost of preservation is considered unsupportable.

During the summer of 2022, the museum began the process of scrapping the Clamagore despite calls to save the historical submarine.

Awards
Meritorious Unit Commendation
Navy Expeditionary Medal
American Campaign Medal
World War II Victory Medal
Navy Occupation Medal with "EUROPE" clasp
National Defense Service Medal with star

See also
List of National Historic Landmarks in South Carolina
National Register of Historic Places listings in Charleston, South Carolina

References

External links

Patriot's Point Maritime Museum
Clamagore Veterans Association
History of Clamagore

Balao-class submarines
Cold War submarines of the United States
Museum ships in South Carolina
National Historic Landmarks in South Carolina
Ships on the National Register of Historic Places in South Carolina
Ships built in Groton, Connecticut
1945 ships
Museums in Charleston County, South Carolina
Military and war museums in South Carolina
National Register of Historic Places in Charleston County, South Carolina
Mount Pleasant, South Carolina